The canton of Le Confluent is an administrative division of the Lot-et-Garonne department, southwestern France. It was created at the French canton reorganisation which came into effect in March 2015. Its seat is in Aiguillon.

It consists of the following communes:
 
Aiguillon
Bazens
Bourran
Clermont-Dessous
Cours
Frégimont
Galapian
Granges-sur-Lot
Lacépède
Lagarrigue
Laugnac
Lusignan-Petit
Madaillan
Montpezat
Nicole
Port-Sainte-Marie
Prayssas
Saint-Salvy
Saint-Sardos
Sembas

References

Cantons of Lot-et-Garonne